Western Algerian Arabic (also known as Northwestern Algerian Arabic, Oranese Arabic or Oranian Arabic; in ) is a dialectal continuum of Algerian dialects Arabic, mainly spoken in Oran, Algeria.

It the western regional dialect of Algerian Arabic, belongs to the Maghrebi Arabic family, and marked by a Berber and Spanish substrates. As well it shares a rich vocabulary common with as the Maltese and the Tunisian Arabic. It has become known outside of Algeria, notably thanks to the Algerian folk music Raï since the 1980s.

See also
 Algerian Arabic

References

Arabic languages
Algerian Arabic